Bernard Povel (August 28, 1897 – October 21, 1952) was a German politician of the Christian Democratic Union (CDU) and former member of the German Bundestag.

Life 
In the election to the first Bundestag in 1949, Povel won the mandate of the Emsland constituency.

Literature

References

1897 births
1952 deaths
Members of the Bundestag for Lower Saxony
Members of the Bundestag 1949–1953
Members of the Bundestag for the Christian Democratic Union of Germany